Another Time is the first compilation album by American band Earth, Wind & Fire, released on September 7, 1974 on Warner Bros. Records. It reached No. 29 on the Billboard Top Soul Albums chart.

Overview
Another Time was issued as a double album with songs compiled from the band's first two albums, Earth, Wind & Fire and The Need of Love. A bonus track, "Handwriting on the Wall", was also included on the album.

Critical reception

Ron Wynn of Allmusic described the songs on Another Time as "certainly worth hearing again". Billboard called the album "enjoyable".

Track listing

Personnel 
Credits adapted from album's text.
Maurice White - vocals, kalimba, drums, percussion
Wade Flemons - vocals
 Don Whitehead - piano, electric piano and vocals
Sherry Scott - vocals
Verdine White - bass
Michael Beal - guitar, harmonica
Yakov Ben Israel - congas, percussion
Chet Washington - tenor sax
Alex Thomas - trombone

Charts

References 

Albums produced by Joe Wissert
Earth, Wind & Fire compilation albums
1974 compilation albums
1974 albums
Warner Records albums
Warner Records compilation albums
Albums recorded at Sunset Sound Recorders